Mallett is a surname. Notable people with the surname include:

 Ashley Mallett, Australian cricketer
 Daryl F. Mallett, American science fiction editor and writer
 David Mallett, American singer-songwriter
 Harry Mallett, English cricketer and administrator
 Garry Mallett, New Zealand politician
 Harry Mallett, English cricketer
 Jane Mallett, Canadian actress
 Jef Mallett, American artist and writer, creator and artist of the comic strip Frazz
 Jeff Mallett, Canadian entrepreneur and investor, COO of Yahoo! 1995–2002
 Jerry Mallett, American baseball player
 Joe Mallett, English professional footballer
 John Mallett, English rugby union player
 Joshua Mallett, American recording artist, producer, DJ and filmmaker
 Keith Mallett, American artist
 Marc Mallett, Northern Irish television presenter and journalist
 Marc Mallett, Northern Irish broadcaster and journalist
 Marla Mallett, Canadian curler
 Martell Mallett, Canadian football running back
 Neal Mallett (born 1957), British fencer
 Nick Mallett, South African rugby union coach and former player
 Pattie Mallette, Canadian author
 Reginald Mallett, Bishop of Northern Indiana
 Robert Mallet (1810–1881), Irish geophysicist, civil engineer, and inventor
 Robert Mallet (writer), French writer
 Ronald Mallett, professor of physics in the University of Connecticut
 Ronnie Mallett, American football player
 Rosemarie Mallett, British Anglican priest
 Ryan Mallett, American football quarterback
 Sarah Mallett (1764–1846), British early Methodist preacher
 Timmy Mallett, English TV presenter and broadcaster
 Xanthé Mallett, Scottish forensic anthropologist, criminologist and television presenter

Fictional characters:
 Billy Mallett, character in the soap opera Coronation Street

See also
 Mallet (surname)
 Mallette, a surname
 Malet, a surname
 Mallet